Kim Jin-woo (born October 9, 1975) is a football player from South Korea who plays as a midfielder.

He represented South Korea at youth and senior levels. However, his contribution to the senior team was brief and consisted of only two matches against New Zealand in 2000.

Kim's entire professional career has been spent with Suwon Samsung Bluewings, 
one of the dominant forces in South Korean football. His debut came during the 1996 season, and by the end of 2005 he had played 279 times for the Suwon Bluewings franchise, scoring two goals and providing 17 assists. In that time he has also committed 727 fouls and has earned himself 77 yellow cards, but never a red one.

Club career statistics

External links
 K-League Player Record 
 FIFA Player Statistics
 

1975 births
Living people
Association football midfielders
South Korean footballers
South Korea international footballers
Suwon Samsung Bluewings players
K League 1 players